Office Girls (literally "Working-Girl Forward"), is a 2011 Taiwanese drama starring Roy Chiu, Ko Chia-yen, James Wen, Tia Li, and Patrick Lee. It started filming in July 2011.

It was first broadcast in Taiwan on free-to-air channel Taiwan Television (TTV) every Sunday at 22:00 from 21 August 2011, and cable TV SET Metro every Saturday at 22:00 from 28 August 2011.

Synopsis
Shen Xing Ren (Ko Chia-yen) is a staff member in the Operations Department of Jing Shi Department Store.  At age 25, she has worked there for four years.  She is tasked with training and mentoring Qin Zi Qi (Roy Chiu), 28, a new entry-level member of the Sales Department.  Unbeknownst to her and almost everyone else there, Zi Qi is the son of Qin Mu Bai (Shen Meng Sheng/沈孟生), the Chairman of Jing Shi Department Store.  Zi Qi's father has challenged him to a test to prove he deserves to lead Jing Shi Department Store - Zi Qi will have to live on a lowly entry-level salary for one year, without the luxuries he is used to, and cannot reveal his true identity.

Xing Ren and Zi Qi clash immediately - she is frugal and hardworking, saving every cent to buy a house in Taipei for her and her mother.  He is careless and used to living large and spending big.  She is extremely loyal to Jing Shi Department Store and is content with her job.  He thinks the department store needs to clean house and get rid of corrupt senior management who are stuck in inefficient ways.

To improve sales, Xing Ren suggests inviting her idol Yu Cheng Feng (James Wen), a handsome and internationally-renown designer, to set up a counter in their store.  Despite Yu Cheng Feng having publicly stated that his designs would never be sold in department stores, Xing Ren (with Zi Qi tagging along) sets out to get him to accept their proposal.  After a lot of hard work on Xing Ren's part, a business relationship is created between Yu and the department store.

Zi Qi is initially attracted to Zheng Kai Er(Tia Li), the lovely and clever assistant manager in the Merchants Department.  Kai Er suspects and later discovers Zi Qi's true identity.  She tentatively agrees to date him but is increasingly jealous of the growing relationship between Zi Qi and Xing Ren.  Kai Er tries to ruin the relationship between the two on a number of occasions.  Zi Qi and Xing Ren, despite their constant bickering, gradually realize they care for each other and begin dating.

Later Zi Qi's indulgent mother returns to Taiwan from the United States.  She tries to force Zi Qi's father to promote him to Executive Vice President but backs down when Zi Qi convinces her that his father is right to challenge him.  He has become accustomed to his new life, drawing inspiration from Xing Ren's example.
Zi Qi's mother initially disapproves of Xing Ren, who she feels is beneath Zi Qi, but comes to accept her.

When Zi Qi's identity is revealed early during a heated argument, Xing Ren is upset that he lied to her and devastated by the resulting gossip.  She eventually forgives him after a cooling off period working with the Yu's in Paris.  The series ends with Xing Ren and Zi Qi's wedding.

Cast

Main characters

Others

Soundtrack

Office Girls Original TV Soundtrack (OST) (小資女孩向前衝 電視原聲帶) was released on February 21, 2012 by various artists under Rock Records (TW) label. It contains 18 tracks total. The opening theme is track 1 "Don’t, Don’t 不要不要" by Genie Chuo 卓文萱. The closing theme is track 4 "Add A Little Happiness 微加幸福" by Yisa Yu 郁可唯.

Track listing

Publications

* 21 December 2011 : Office Girls Photobook (小資女孩向前衝 職場生存之道) -  - Author: Sanlih E-Television 三立電視監製 - Publisher: KADOKAWA Media (Taiwan) 台灣角川 
A 128 page photobook was published in 2011 detailing production details of the drama. The book was published before the completion of the drama. 
* 24 September 2011 : Office Girls Original Novel (小資女孩向前衝 原創小說) -  - Author: Sanlih E-Television 三立電視監製 & Zhu Liang Yun Ru 著梁蘊如 - Publisher: KADOKAWA Media (Taiwan) 台灣角川 
A novel based on the drama was published detailing the entire story line of the drama. Spoilers are revealed in the novel before the drama finished airing.

DVD release
* 2 February 2012 :Office Girls (Part I) (DVD) (Taiwan Version) - DVD All Region - Disc: 4 DVDs (Ep.1-12) - Publisher: Cai Chang International Multimedia Inc. (TW) 
Official Taiwan version of the drama DVD set part 1 showing episode 1 to 12, comes in original Mandarin language and Chinese subtitles only.
* 30 March 2012 :Office Girls (Part II) (DVD) (Taiwan Version) - DVD All Region - Disc: 5 DVDs (Ep.13-25) - Publisher: Cai Chang International Multimedia Inc. (TW) 
Official Taiwan version of the drama DVD set part 2 showing episode 13 to 25, comes in original Mandarin language and Chinese subtitles only.

Broadcast

International broadcast
 Bolivia: Red Uno (2015)
 Chile: Vía X (2014)
 Ecuador: Ecuavisa (2016)
 Japan: DATV (2012), as Susume! Kirameki joshi (進め!キラメキ女子)
 Latin America: Mundo Drama (streaming), ViX (streaming, 2022-)
 Panama: SERTV (2017)
 United States: Pasiones TV (Spanish), Hulu, Netflix & Ultra Familia

Episode ratings

References

External links
 TTV Office Girls official homepage 
 SETTV Office Girls official blog 

Taiwanese drama television series
Taiwan Television original programming
Sanlih E-Television original programming
2011 Taiwanese television series debuts
2011 Taiwanese television series endings
2010s Taiwanese television series